Italiano Moderno is the second studio album by Danish rock band Warm Guns, released in 1981. It was re-released in 1982 with a new track list, replacing four album tracks with the EP 4 Heartbreakers Only.

Track listing

Side 1 
 "Arrivederci"  (Muhl) – 2:50
 "Wonderkids"  (Muhl/Muhl-Hauschildt) – 3:33
 "Big Sleep"  (Muhl) – 2:23
 "Golden Dreams"  (Muhl-Hybel/Muhl) – 3:45
 "Nightcrawlers"  (Muhl/Hauschildt) – 2:48
 "Public Enemies"  (Muhl) – 2:59

Side 2 
 "The Night Belongs to You"  (Muhl) – 2:42
 "Hard Luck"  (Muhl) – 3:13
 "Magic Motions"  (Muhl) – 2:47
 "Break or Bend"  (Muhl) – 2:13
 "Luckie Walkie"  (Muhl) – 3:39
 "No Alibi"  (Muhl) – 2:39

Recording 
Produced by Rod Huison. Basic tracks recorded at Werner Studios, Copenhagen. Additional tracks and mix done at Eden Studios, London.

"Arrivederci" and "Luckie Walkie" produced by Nils Henriksen and recorded at Werner Studios, Copenhagen.

Personnel 
 Lars Muhl: vocals & keyboards
 Lars Hybel: guitars & bass
 Frank Lorentzen: guitars & keyboards
 Jens G. Nielsen: drums
Additional musicians
 Georg Olesen: bass ("Big Sleep", "Golden Dreams", "Nightcrawlers", "Magic Motions")
 Jacob Perbøll: bass ("Arrivederci", "Luckie Walkie")

Track listing (1982 version)

Side 1 
 "Can't Give or Take Anymore"  (Muhl) – 3:28
 "Wild Life"  (Muhl) – 2:20
 "Luckie Walkie"  (Muhl) – 3:39
 "Arrivederci"  (Muhl) – 2:50
 "The Young Go First"  (Muhl) – 4:23 
 "Heart of Stone"  (Jagger/Richard) – 2:50

Side 2 
 "Wonderkids"  (Muhl/Muhl-Hauschildt) – 3:33
 "Magic Motions"  (Muhl) – 2:47
 "Hard Luck"  (Muhl) – 3:13
 "Golden Dreams"  (Muhl-Hybel/Muhl) – 3:45
 "Nightcrawlers"  (Muhl/Hauschildt) – 2:48
 "Break or Bend"  (Muhl) – 2:13

 Side 1 tracks 1, 2, 5 & 6 from 4 Heartbreakers Only (1982)
 Side 1 tracks 3 & 4 + side 2 tracks 1 – 6 from Italiano Moderno (original 1981 version)
 Side 1 track 5 originally from Instant Schlager (1980)

References

External links 
 Discogs.com

Vertigo Records albums
1981 albums
Warm Guns albums